This Is the Moment! (subtitled Kenny Dorham Sings and Plays) is an album by American jazz trumpeter Kenny Dorham featuring performances recorded in 1958 and released on the Riverside label. Dorham sings on the album, for the first and only time in his discography. The album marks the recording debut of pianist Cedar Walton.

Reception

The AllMusic review by Scott Yanow awarded the album 4 stars and stated that "this recording must have surprised most jazz listeners at the time, for trumpeter Kenny Dorham sings on all ten selections... Dorham had an OK voice, musical if not memorable, but the arrangements for these selections are inventive and pleasing."

Track listing
 "Autumn Leaves" (Joseph Kosma, Jacques Prévert, Johnny Mercer) - 3:09  
 "I Remember Clifford" (Benny Golson, Jon Hendricks) - 2:56  
 "Since I Fell for You" (Buddy Johnson) - 4:16  
 "I Understand" (Kim Gannon, Mabel Wayne) - 4:12  
 "From This Moment On" (Cole Porter) - 4:47  
 "This Is the Moment" (Frederick Hollander, Leo Robin) - 2:37  
 "Angel Eyes" (Earl Brent, Matt Dennis) - 5:26  
 "Where Are You?" (Harold Adamson, Jimmy McHugh) - 4:29  
 "Golden Earrings" (Ray Evans, Jay Livingston, Victor Young) - 2:41  
 "Make Me a Present of You" (Joe Greene) - 3:07

Recorded by Jack Higgins at Reeves Sound Studios in New York City on July 7, 1958 (tracks 1, 3-4, 6-8 & 10) and May 27 (tracks 2, 5 & 9), 1957

Personnel
Kenny Dorham - trumpet, vocals
Curtis Fuller - trombone  
Cedar Walton - piano
Sam Jones - bass 
G.T. Hogan (tracks 2, 5 & 9), Charlie Persip (tracks 1, 3, 4, 6-8 & 10) - drums

References 

Riverside Records albums
Kenny Dorham albums
1958 albums